The men's 4×400 metres relay at the 2004 Summer Olympics as part of the athletics program was held at the Athens Olympic Stadium from August 27 to 28. The sixteen teams competed in a two-heat qualifying round in which the first three teams from each heat, together with the next two fastest teams, were given a place in the final race.

The American dominance in this relay event had become increasingly clear, having swept the medals in the 400 metres five days earlier. From an explosive start in the final, Otis Harris led off for the U.S. team and gave them a relentless lead over the rest of the field throughout the race. With no other team aiming to chase the Americans on the home stretch, the foursome of Harris, Derrick Brew, Olympic 400 metres champion Jeremy Wariner, and Darold Williamson stormed away to an effortless triumph in a time of 2:55.91, nearly five seconds ahead of the silver-winning Aussie squad.  Meanwhile, the Nigerians stayed much closer with Japan and Great Britain on the final bend, until they outlasted the rivals in a desperately tight finish for the bronze.

The victory also helped the Americans compensate for the surprising runner-up finish of their team in the earlier sprint relay.

Records
, the existing World and Olympic records were as follows.

No new records were set during the competition.

Qualification
The qualification period for athletics was 1 January 2003 to 9 August 2004. A National Olympic Committee (NOC) could enter one qualified relay team per relay event, with a maximum of six athletes. For this event, an NOC would be invited to participate with a relay team if the average of the team's two best times, obtained in IAAF-sanctioned meetings or tournaments, would be among the best sixteen, at the end of this period.

Schedule
All times are Greece Standard Time (UTC+2)

Results

Round 1
Qualification rule: The first three teams in each heat (Q) plus the next two fastest overall (q) moved on to the final.

Heat 1

Heat 2

Final

References

External links
 IAAF Athens 2004 Olympic Coverage

M
Relay foot races at the Olympics
Men's events at the 2004 Summer Olympics